De-Loused in the Comatorium (commonly referred to as De-Loused) is the debut studio album by American progressive rock band the Mars Volta, released on June 24, 2003, on Gold Standard Laboratories and Universal Records. Based on a short story written by lead singer Cedric Bixler-Zavala and sound manipulation artist Jeremy Ward, the concept album is an hour-long tale of Cerpin Taxt, a man who enters a week-long coma after overdosing on a mixture of morphine and rat poison. The story of Cerpin Taxt alludes to the death of El Paso, Texas artist—and Bixler-Zavala's friend—Julio Venegas (1972–1996).

Co-produced by Rick Rubin and guitarist Omar Rodríguez-López, it is the only studio album to feature founding member Jeremy Ward, who was found dead in an apparent heroin overdose one month before the album was released. Following the departure of Eva Gardner who had appeared on the band's early demos and EP, Red Hot Chili Peppers bassist Flea performed on De-Loused.

The music contained in De-Loused is distinguished by its enigmatic lyrics, Latin and jazz rhythms, and Rodríguez-López's frenetic guitar riffs, which are often strongly dissonant. The title of the album is taken from the lyrics of the song "Eunuch Provocateur" on the band's previous release, Tremulant (meanwhile, "Take the Veil Cerpin Taxt" contains the title of Tremulant). The cover artwork is by Storm Thorgerson.

Background and recording
Two songs from the album, "Roulette Dares (The Haunt Of)" and "Cicatriz ESP", first appeared in 2001 as the band's very first demo recordings with bassist Eva Gardner and drummer Blake Fleming; notably, the early version of "Cicatriz ESP" (then known as "Cicatrix") was slower and much shorter (4 minutes) than the album one (at 12 minutes being the longest track on the album).

The album is a progressive rock and art rock album that also incorporates influences from psychedelia, Latin jazz, heavy metal, punk rock and blues rock.

Reception 

De-Loused became, both critically and commercially, the band's biggest hit, eventually selling in excess of 500,000 copies despite limited promotion, and was featured on several critics' "Best of the Year" lists. The album was ranked number 55 on the October 2006 issue of Guitar World magazine's list of the 100 greatest guitar albums of all time. "Drunkship of Lanterns" was named the 91st best guitar song of all-time by Rolling Stone.

As of February 2007 it had sold 434,000 copies in the United States.

As of June 2016, the album had a score of 82 out of 100 from Metacritic based on "universal acclaim". Alternative Press gave the album a perfect score of all five stars and said it "takes multiple listens to absorb, and, even then, you're probably not going to have a clue to what Bixler's raving about." Yahoo! Music UK gave it a score of eight stars out of ten and said it was "not an album to listen to casually. It insists on taking over your life for an hour, demands a level of concentration rare in rock, amply repays multiple plays." Under the Radar gave the album eight stars out of ten and said that the band "has created the antithesis of ATDI, leaving behind any formula or typicality. What they kept was the fire, the fury, and the passion." Drowned in Sound gave it a score of eight out of ten and called it "truly exquisite and well worth the wait." Playlouder gave it a score of four stars out of five and said, "There are moments of prog rock, jazz fusion and freakydelia in this rush of ideas and if that sounds awful then don't be put off. Instead of the shambolic mess that this kinda influence normally entails Mars Volta have come strictly disciplined." Uncut gave it four stars out of five and said: "Imagine a jam session between King Crimson, Fugazi and '70s Miles. Now imagine it working. That's the Mars Volta." Blender also gave it four stars and said it "Roars like Led Zeppelin, churns like King Crimson and throbs like early Santana." Tiny Mix Tapes likewise gave it a score of four out of five and called it "a very strong debut album for the Mars Volta." Ink 19 Magazine also gave it a favorable review and said it was "definitely worth checking out, but make sure to keep an open mind and check any preconceived notions at the door."

In 2014, readers of Rhythm voted it the ninth-greatest drumming album in the history of progressive rock.  The album was also included in the book 1001 Albums You Must Hear Before You Die. The album was included as number 25 on Rolling Stones list of "50 Greatest Prog Rock Albums of All Time".

Track listing

Notes
 "Son et lumière" is French for "Sound and Light". 
  ESP stands for "Ectopic Shapeshifting Penance-propulsion", as opposed to the traditional "Extrasensory Perception". 
 "Tira me a las arañas" is slightly misspelled Spanish for "Throw Me to the Spiders" (the correct spelling is "Tírame a las arañas"). 
 "Cicatriz" is Spanish and Portuguese for "Scar". 
 "This Apparatus Must Be Unearthed" is a play on the warning frequently found on guitar amplifiers and other electrical equipment, "This Apparatus Must Be Earthed".

Personnel
The following people contributed to De-Loused in the Comatorium:

Band
Cedric Bixler-Zavala – vocals
Omar Rodríguez-López – guitar, bass ("Ambuletz")
Jon Theodore – drums
Isaiah "Ikey" Owens – keyboards
Flea – bass (except "Televators" and "Ambuletz")
Jeremy Ward – effects and sound manipulation

Additional musicians
Lenny Castro – percussion
John Frusciante – additional guitar and synthesizer treatment ("Cicatriz ESP")
Justin Meldal-Johnsen – stand-up bass ("Televators")

Recording personnel
Rick Rubin – producer
Omar Rodríguez-López – producer
Dave Schiffman – recording
Andrew Scheps – additional recording
Phillip Groussard – assistant engineer, recording engineer ("Ambuletz")
Darren Mora – assistant engineer
Rich Costey – mixing engineer
Jason Lader – mixing engineer ("Ambuletz")
Lindsay Chase – album production coordination
Vlado Meller – mastering
Pete Lyman – mastering (vinyl)
Steve Kadison – mastering assistance

Artwork
Storm Thorgerson – cover design, art direction
Peter Curzon – cover design, graphics
Rupert Truman – photography
Dan Abbott – illustrations

Singles
"Inertiatic ESP" (2003)
"Televators" (2003)

Charts

Certifications

References

External links
Mix Online article - Technical report/interview on the making of De-Loused in the Comatorium.
 

Albums produced by Rick Rubin
The Mars Volta albums
2003 debut albums
Concept albums
Albums with cover art by Storm Thorgerson
Gold Standard Laboratories albums
Albums produced by Omar Rodríguez-López
Universal Records albums
Albums recorded at The Mansion (recording studio)